Operation Chrome Dome was a United States Air Force Cold War-era mission from 1960 to 1968 in which B-52 strategic bomber aircraft armed with thermonuclear weapons remained on continuous airborne alert and flew routes to points on the Soviet Union's border.

Background 
During the Cold War, General Thomas S. Power initiated a program whereby B-52s performed airborne-alert duty under code names such as Head Start, Chrome Dome, Hard Head, Round Robin, and Operation Giant Lance. Bombers loitered near points outside the Soviet Union to provide rapid first-strike or retaliation capability in case of nuclear war.

Primary mission 
The missions in 1964 involved a B-52D that left Sheppard Air Force Base, Texas, and flew across the United States to New England and headed out to the Atlantic Ocean. The aircraft refueled over the Atlantic heading north to and around Newfoundland. The bomber changed course and flew northwesterly over Baffin Bay towards Thule Air Base, Greenland.  It then flew west across Queen Elizabeth Islands of Canada. Continuing to Alaska, it refueled over the Pacific Ocean, again heading southeast, and returned to Sheppard AFB.

By 1966, three separate missions were being flown: one east over the Atlantic and the Mediterranean, another north to Baffin Bay, and a third over Alaska.

Military units
The following military units were involved:
 Strategic Air Command Divisions:
 306th Bombardment Wing
 494th Bombardment Wing, Sheppard Air Force Base
 821st Strategic Aerospace Division
 822d Air Division
 Homestead Air Force Base
 Strategic Air Command in the United Kingdom
 2nd Bomb Wing, 62nd Bomb Squadron Barksdale AFB, Bossier City, Louisiana
 Strategic Air Command 42 Bomb Wing Loring AFB, Limestone, Maine
 4126/456th bomb wing Beale AFB   Marysville  California

Accidents

The program was involved in the following nuclear-weapons accidents:
 1961 Goldsboro B-52 crash
 1961 Yuba City B-52 crash
 1964 Savage Mountain B-52 crash
 1966 Palomares B-52 crash
 1968 Thule Air Base B-52 crash. The Thule accident signaled the end of the program on January 22, 1968.

See also

 Fail-Safe (1964 film), a film about a strategic bomber aircraft that receives an attack order while patrolling the Soviet border.
 Dr. Strangelove (1964 film), a black comedy about a mad American general ordering nuclear bombers under his control on a Chrome Dome type alert, to attack the Soviet Union.

References
Informational notes

Citations

External links
 SAC'S Deadly Daily Dozen at Time Magazine

1960 establishments in the United States
1960 in international relations
1960 in military history
1960s in the United States
1960s in the Soviet Union
Nuclear history of the United States
Nuclear warfare
Soviet Union–United States relations
Military operations of the Cold War
United States nuclear command and control
1960 in politics